The 1990–91 Arizona Wildcats men's basketball team represented the University of Arizona as a member of the Pacific-10 Conference during the 1990–91 NCAA Division I men's basketball season. Led by head coach Lute Olson, the team played its home games in the McKale Center in Tucson, Arizona. Arizona won the Pac-10 regular season title by 3 games over second-place UCLA.

Roster

Schedule and results

|-
!colspan=12 style=| Regular Season

|-
!colspan=12 style=| NCAA Tournament

Rankings

Team players drafted into the NBA

References

Arizona
Arizona
Arizona Wildcats men's basketball seasons
1990 in sports in Arizona
Arizona Wildcats